Dead on Time is a 1983 British short film directed by Lyndall Hobbs and written by Richard Curtis and Rowan Atkinson.

Plot
The film is a comedy which tells the story of Bernard Fripp (Rowan Atkinson) a man who, on attending a routine check-up, is diagnosed by his doctor (Nigel Hawthorne) as having a rare disease leaving him only 30 minutes to live.

By the time he leaves the surgery, he only has 24 minutes left, in which he attempts to live life to the full; taking out his life savings, trying to make peace with God (via a vicar played by (Jim Broadbent)), attempting to learn about the significance of the Mona Lisa, reading the back cover of War and Peace to find out what happens in it, listening to Albinoni's Adagio in G minor and looking for true love.

Production
The featurette was shot in early 1982, at the same time Atkinson wrapped up taping Not The Nine O'Clock News and began working on The Black Adder, premièring later that year and getting a wide theatrical release in February 1983. The meek, socially awkward Bernard is a reworking of an earlier Atkinson character, Robert Box, who appeared on the 1979 special Canned Laughter, which shares a gag regarding the main character tripping over a "Please Help the Blind" sign. Both Fripp and Box have been cited to be prototypes for Mr. Bean.

Cast
 Rowan Atkinson as Bernard Fripp 
 Peter Bull as Old Man in Waiting Room 
 Jo Kendall as Nurse 
 Nigel Hawthorne as Doctor 
 Nell Campbell as Female Teller 
 Joshua White as Bank Customer 
 Hugh Thomas as Teller 
 Alex Norton as Foreigner 
 Christopher Biggins as Bigot 
 Rupert Everett as Bank Customer / Blind Man 
 Adrian Edmondson as Fool (credited as Ade Edmonton)
 Robin Bailey as Intelligent Man
 Tim McInnerny as Customer
 Jim Broadbent as Priest and God
 Greta Scacchi as Pretty Girl
 Nigel Planer as Boring Friend
 Gorden Kaye as Moonie
 Leslie Ash as Girl in Café
 Richard Curtis as Customer in Café

The film features a large number of cameo parts for actors and actresses, often from the alternative comedy circuit, who would later star in their own comedy series, including Leslie Ash, Adrian Edmondson, Tim McInnerny and Nigel Planer. Richard Curtis makes a brief appearance as an angry café customer.

References

External links

1983 films
1983 comedy films
1983 short films
Films directed by Lyndall Hobbs
British comedy short films
Films with screenplays by Rowan Atkinson
Films with screenplays by Richard Curtis
1980s English-language films
1980s British films